Sea lemon may refer to:

 a common name for sea slugs or nudibranchs in the taxonomic family Dorididae
 Ximenia americana, a tree species native to Australia and Asia